U47 may refer to:

 German submarine U-47 
 Neumann U47 microphone
 Small nucleolar RNA SNORD47, a molecule